Gianfranco De Bosio (16 September 1924 – 2 May 2022) was an Italian film and theatre director.

Filmography

Cinema
The Terrorist (1963)
In Love, Every Pleasure Has Its Pain (1971)

Television
Giorgio Dandin (1971)
Moses the Lawgiver (1974)
 (1976)
Il mercante di Venezia (1979)
 (1982)
Elisabetta, regina d'Inghilterra (1985)
Venezia salvata o la congiura tradita (1986)
Un ballo in maschera (1986)

References

1924 births
2022 deaths
Italian film directors
Italian screenwriters
Italian theatre directors
Knights Grand Cross of the Order of Merit of the Italian Republic
University of Padua alumni
People from Verona

External links